This is a list of properties and districts in Camden County, Georgia that are listed on the National Register of Historic Places (NRHP).

Current listings

|}

References

Camden
Buildings and structures in Camden County, Georgia